Huron—Perth was a federal electoral district represented in the House of Commons of Canada from 1935 to 1953. It was located in the province of Ontario. This riding was created in 1933 from parts of Huron South and Perth South ridings.

It was initially defined to consist of the townships of Fullarton and Hibbert in the county of Perth, the townships of Hullett, McKillop, Stanley, Tuckersmith, Hay, Stephen and Usborne in the county of Huron.

In 1947, the riding was expanded to include the township of Logan and the town of Mitchell in the county of Perth.

The electoral district was abolished in 1952 when it was redistributed between Huron and Perth ridings.

Members of Parliament

This riding elected the following members of the House of Commons of Canada:

Election results

|}

|}

|}

|}

See also 

 List of Canadian federal electoral districts
 Past Canadian electoral districts

External links 
Riding history from the Library of Parliament

Former federal electoral districts of Ontario